This is the list of serving Air Officers of the Bangladesh Air Force. At present, the air force has 1 Air Chief Marshal (ACM), no Air Marshal (AM), 13 Air Vice Marshals (AVM) and 15+ Air Commodores (Air Cdre).

Flag of the Bangladesh Air Force.
 Air Chief Marshal 
  Air Chief Marshal Shaikh Abdul Hannan,BBP, BUP, nswc, fawc, psc, GD(P) - No 8 GD(P), Chief of Air Staff (COAS)
 Air  Marshal 
  Vacant 
 Air Vice Marshal 
 Air Vice Marshal AHM Fazlul Haque, BSP, ndu, afwc, psc, GD(P) - No 11 GD(P)  Assistant Chief of Air Staff (Operations) ACAS(Ops)
 Air Vice Marshal Hasan Mahmood Khan OSP, GUP, nswc, psc, GD(P)- No 11 GD(P) Assistant Chief of Air Staff (Plans) ACAS(Plans) 
 Air Vice Marshal Md Zahidul Sayeed, BUP, ndc, psc, Engineering - 24 Non GD, Assistant Chief of Air Staff (Maintenance) ACAS(Maintenance)
 Air Vice Marshal Md Zahidur Rahman BSP, GUP, nswc, psc, GD(P) - No 12 GD(P), Assistant Chief of Air Staff (Administration) ACAS(Admin)
 Air Vice Marshal MA Awal Hossain GUP, nswc, psc, GD(P)- No 15 GD(P), Air Officer Commanding,AOC BAF Base Bangabandhu (Kurmitola)
 Air Vice Marshal Sharif Uddin Sarkar, GUP, ndc, afwc, psc, GD(P) - No 15 GD(P) Air Officer Commanding, AOC BAF Base Bashar(Dhaka)
 Air Vice Marshal Javed Tanveer Khan, BSP, ACSC, Ndc,psc, Air Officer Commanding, AOC BAF Base Bir Sreshto Matiur Rahman (Jashore)
 Air Vice Marshal Badrul Amin, GUP, ndc, afwc, psc, GD(P) - No 15 GD(P) Air Officer Commanding, AOC BAF Base Zahurul Haque (Chattogram)
 Air Vice Marshal Md Towhidul Islam, BPP, ndc, psc, Engineering - 25 Non GD, Commandant Bangabandhu Aeronautical Centre (BAC)
 Air Vice Marshal Muhammad Kamrul Islam BSP, GUP, nswc, afwc, psc, GD(P) - No 12 GD(P),  Senior Directing Staff (Air), National Defense College, Mirpur, Dhaka
 Air Vice Marshal Muhammad Mafidur Rahman, BUP, ndu, afwc, psc, GD(P) - No 11 GD(P), Chairman, Civil Aviation Authority of Bangladesh (CAAB) 
 Air Vice Marshal ASM Fakhrul Islam, GUP, ndc, afwc, psc, GD(P) - No 14 GD(P), - Vice Chancellor, VC Bangabandhu Sheikh Mujibur Rahman Aviation and Aerospace University
 Air Vice Marshal Mohammad Mostafizur Rahman GUP, ndc, psc, GD(P), No 13 GD(P) - Ambassador, Embassy of People's Republic of Bangladesh, Indonesia 
 Air Commodore 

 Air Commodore Md. Aminul Haque, ndc, psc - Head of department, Senior Instructor, Department of Aeronautical Engineering (AE), Military Institute of Science and Technology, Mirpur, Dhaka.
 Air Commodore Mohammad Khairul Afsar, GUP, ndc, psc - Commandant, Airmen Training Institute, Chattogram

See also
 List of serving generals of the Bangladesh Army
 List of serving admirals of the Bangladesh Navy

References

External links and sources
 Inter Services Press Release (ISPR) Bangladesh
 List of serving generals of the Bangladesh Army
 List of serving admirals of the Bangladesh Navy
 Bangladesh Air Force
 Bangladesh Air Force
 Join Bangladesh Air Force

Bangladesh Air Force air marshals
Air marshals
Bangladesh Air Force